Junoon - Kuchh Kar Dikhaane Ka is a singing reality show. Junoon premiered on NDTV Imagine on 6 June 2008. Hosted by Annu Kapoor, the show involves 3 teams of 6 players each.

Show Format

Team 1 (Sufi Ke Sultan) 
Jaswinder Singh
Harshdeep Kaur
 Mohammad Vakil
Kavita Seth
 Ali Abbas
 Akbar Ali

Team 2 (Maati Ke Lal) 
Ahmed Hassan
 Aashraf Khan
Kalpana Patowary
 Rajeev Chamba
Malini Awasthi
Lakhwinder Wadali

Team 3 (Bollywood Ke Baadshah) 
 Rehaan Khan
Sharib Sabri
 Shadab
 Tarannum
Antara Mitra
 Saptak

Judges/Mentors 
Ustaad Rahat Fateh Ali Khan ... Sufi Ke Sultan
Ila Arun ... Maati Ke Laal
Anand Raj Anand ... Bollywood Ke Baadshah

Timing 
Friday and Saturday 20:00(8:30 PM) IST ... Main Show Time

References

External links 
Official Site

Indian television series
2008 Indian television series debuts
Imagine TV original programming
Indian reality television series